The 1995 Lehigh Engineers football team was an American football team that represented Lehigh University during the 1995 NCAA Division I-AA football season. Lehigh won the Patriot League championship.

In their eighth and final year under head coach Kevin Higgins, the Engineers compiled an 8–3 record. Bob Aylsworth, D'Andre Dina, Brian Klingerman and Roman McDonald were the team captains.

The Engineers outscored opponents 306 to 272. Lehigh's undefeated (5–0) conference record topped the six-team Patriot League standings. The championship was Lehigh's second in three years. Patriot League rules at the time prohibited members from participating in the national postseason tournament. 

This was the last year that Lehigh officially used "Engineers" as its team name. At its November 11 game, the school introduced "the Mountain Hawk" as a costumed mascot, and the team name reflected this change in time for the 1996 season.

Lehigh played its home games at Goodman Stadium on the university's Goodman Campus in Bethlehem, Pennsylvania.

Schedule

References

Lehigh
Lehigh Mountain Hawks football seasons
Patriot League football champion seasons
Lehigh Engineers football